Angela Maria "Geli" Raubal (4 June 1908 – 18 September 1931) was an Austrian woman who was the half-niece of Adolf Hitler. Born in Linz, Austria-Hungary, she was the second child and eldest daughter of Leo Raubal Sr. and Hitler's half-sister, Angela Raubal. Raubal lived in close contact with her uncle Adolf from 1925 until her presumed suicide in 1931.

Life 
Angela Maria "Geli" Raubal was born in Linz, Austria-Hungary, where she was raised with her brother Leo and sister Elfriede. Her father died at the age of 31 when Geli was two. She and Elfriede accompanied their mother when she became Hitler's housekeeper in 1925; Raubal was 17 at the time and spent the next six years in close contact with her half-uncle, who was 19 years her senior. Her mother was given a position as housekeeper at the Berghof near Berchtesgaden in 1928. Raubal moved into Hitler's Munich apartment in 1929 when she enrolled in medicine at Ludwig Maximilian University but she did not complete her studies.

As Hitler rose to power as leader of the Nazi Party, he was domineering and possessive of Raubal, keeping control of her. When he discovered in December 1927 that she was having a relationship with his chauffeur, Emil Maurice, he forced her to end the affair and dismissed Maurice from his service. After that he did not allow her to associate with friends and attempted to have himself or someone he trusted near her at all times, accompanying her on shopping trips, to the cinema and to the opera.

Death 
Raubal was living in Hitler's Munich apartment, and he maintained strict control over her actions. She was in effect a prisoner, and planned to escape to Vienna to continue her singing lessons. Her mother told interrogators after the war that Hitler had forbidden her daughter to continue her relationship with a man from Linz whom she was hoping to marry. Hitler and Raubal argued on 18 September 1931 when he refused to allow her to go to Vienna. He departed for a meeting in Nuremberg but was recalled to Munich the next day with the news that Raubal was dead from a gunshot wound to the lung; she had apparently shot herself in Hitler's Munich apartment with Hitler's Walther pistol. She was 23.

Rumours immediately began in the media about physical abuse, a possible sexual relationship, an infatuation by Raubal for her uncle, and even murder. The Münchener Post reported that the dead woman had a fractured nose. Otto Strasser, a political opponent of Hitler, was the source of some of the more sensational stories. The historian Ian Kershaw maintains that "whether actively sexual or not, Hitler's behaviour towards Geli has all the traits of a strong, latent at least, sexual dependence." The police ruled out foul play and the death was ruled a suicide. Hitler was devastated and went into an intense depression. He moved to a house on the shores of Tegernsee lake and did not attend the funeral in Vienna on 24 September. He visited her grave at Vienna's Zentralfriedhof (Central Cemetery) two days later. Thereafter, he overcame his depression and refocused on politics.

Hitler later declared that Raubal was the only woman he had ever loved. Her room at Haus Wachenfeld was kept as she had left it, and he hung portraits of her in his own room there and at the Reich Chancellery in Berlin.

In a 1992 Vanity Fair article, Ron Rosenbaum examines several theories, including speculation that Hitler intentionally or accidentally shot and killed Raubal during an argument, or that she was killed on his orders. According to William Stuart-Houston, Hitler's nephew through his half-brother, Alois, "When I visited Berlin in 1931, the family was in trouble. ... Everyone knew that Hitler and she had long been intimate and that she had been expecting a child – a fact that enraged Hitler."

See also 
 Hitler family

Notes

References

Bibliography

Further reading

External links 
 

1908 births
1931 suicides
Austrian Roman Catholics
Austrian expatriates in Germany
Burials at the Vienna Central Cemetery
Death conspiracy theories
Hitler family
Ludwig Maximilian University of Munich alumni
People from Linz
Suicides by firearm in Germany